Henri Catelan (13 July 1895 – 16 June 1980) was a French racing cyclist. He finished in last place in the 1921 Tour de France.

References

External links
 

1895 births
1980 deaths
French male cyclists
Sportspeople from Le Havre
Cyclists from Normandy